The 44th Primetime Emmy Awards were held on Sunday, August 30, 1992. The ceremony was broadcast on Fox from the Pasadena Civic Auditorium in Pasadena, California. It was hosted by Tim Allen, Kirstie Alley and Dennis Miller, and directed by Walter C. Miller. Presenters included Roseanne Barr, Tom Arnold, Scott Bakula, Candice Bergen, Corbin Bernsen, Beau Bridges, Lloyd Bridges, and Cindy Crawford. The program was written by Buddy Sheffield and Bruce Vilanch. Over 300 million people watched the ceremony in 30 countries. 

A rule change, instituted for this year only, stated that regular and guest performers would compete in the same category. There could be lead guest or supporting guest. This rule allowed Hollywood stalwarts such as Kirk Douglas, who appeared in one episode of the anthology series Tales from the Crypt, and Christopher Lloyd, who guest-starred on Road to Avonlea, to be nominated for the leading actor award (and, in Lloyd's case, to win). However, the rule also meant that, for instance, Harrison Page got nominated as a lead on Quantum Leap alongside Scott Bakula, even though Page appeared in a supporting role in one episode while Bakula starred in every installment, and Shirley Knight got nominated for one episode of Law & Order while the regular cast didn't receive any nominations. The rule was reverted the following year.

On the comedy side, Murphy Brown won Outstanding Comedy Series for the second time, winning three major awards on the night, the most for a comedy series. On the drama side, L.A. Laws strangle hold on Outstanding Drama Series came to an end, as Northern Exposure took home the award. Northern Exposure also won three major awards and received nine major nominations, which tied for the most in each category. For the first time in its run, The Golden Girls, then in its seventh and final season, was not nominated for Outstanding Comedy Series.

For the first time, the Lead Actor, Drama award went outside the Big Four television networks to a cable network show: Christopher Lloyd in Road to Avonlea, from the Disney Channel.

After being on the air for thirty years, The Tonight Show Starring Johnny Carson finally heard its name called when its final season won for Outstanding Variety, Music, or Comedy Program. The show was first nominated for the category in 1964 and was 0/13 before this ceremony.

As of the 2021 Emmy ceremony, this was the last year where the Big Four broadcast networks received all the nominations in both the Comedy and Drama Series categories.

Winners and nominees

Programs

Acting

Lead performances

Supporting performances

Directing

Writing

Most major nominations
By network 
 NBC – 57
 CBS – 33
 ABC – 25

By program
 I'll Fly Away (NBC) / Northern Exposure (CBS) – 9
 Seinfeld (NBC) – 8
 Miss Rose White (NBC) / Murphy Brown (CBS) – 7
 Cheers (NBC) – 6

Most major awards
By network 
 NBC – 9
 CBS – 8
 ABC – 5
 HBO – 2

By program
 Miss Rose White (NBC) / Murphy Brown (CBS) / Northern Exposure (CBS) – 3
 I'll Fly Away (NBC) – 2

Notes

References

External links
 Emmys.com list of 1992 Nominees & Winners
 

044
1992 television awards
Primetime Emmy
August 1992 events in the United States
Events in Pasadena, California
20th century in Pasadena, California
Television shows directed by Walter C. Miller